Carex satsumensis is a tussock-forming species of perennial sedge in the family Cyperaceae. It is native to Taiwan, Vietnam, the Philippines and central and southern parts of Japan.

See also
List of Carex species

References

satsumensis
Taxa named by Adrien René Franchet
Taxa named by Ludovic Savatier
Plants described in 1878
Flora of Japan
Flora of Taiwan
Flora of Vietnam
Flora of the Philippines